Contact High is a 2009 Austrian comedy film directed by Michael Glawogger and starring Michael Ostrowski and Raimund Wallisch. The film showed at the 44th Karlovy Vary International Film Festival in 2009 out of competition.

Cast 
 Michael Ostrowski as Max
 Raimund Wallisch as Johann
 Pia Hierzegger as Mao
 Georg Friedrich as Schorsch
 Detlev Buck as Harry

References

External links 

2009 comedy films
2009 films
Austrian comedy films
2000s German-language films